Beer cheese is a cheese spread most commonly found in Kentucky. Similarly named cheese products can be found in other regions of the United States, but beer cheese spread itself is not widely distributed. Despite this fact, the product is nearly ubiquitous in Kentucky. There are a number of different brands that are popular – most are similar in taste and texture. Fans of the snack usually have their favorite brand, and there are many homemade versions which use a wide variety of ingredients to add personalization.

Commercially produced beer cheese spread usually consists of a processed cheese base with a sharp cheddar flavor, while homemade varieties almost always start with sharp cheddar cheese. To this, enough beer is added to provide flavor and texture, as well as garlic, and a variety of spices including dry mustard, horseradish and cayenne pepper. Most varieties come in "mild" and "hot" versions, but all tend to have a strong garlic flavor. Beer cheese is traditionally served with saltine crackers, although it can be found served with various other crackers and crudités, most often as an appetizer.

Origins
While there are conflicting stories about beer cheese's origins, it appears to have first been served in the 1940s at a restaurant in Clark County, Kentucky known as Johnny Allman's. The owner of the restaurant, John Allman, credited the invention of the cheese spread to his cousin, Joe Allman, a chef in Phoenix, Arizona. Joe's Southwestern influence is said by some to explain the spread's spicy nature.

On February 21, 2013, the Kentucky Legislature decreed Clark County as the birthplace of beer cheese.

Trivia
Queen Elizabeth II of the United Kingdom was reportedly a fan of beer cheese. It is reported that she took some home with her after a visit to Lexington.

Events
An annual Beer Cheese Festival is held in downtown Winchester, KY (the county seat of Clark County) featuring local arts & crafts vendors as well as both commercial and amateur recipe contests.

See also
 List of spreads
 Pub cheese

References

External links
 

Appetizers
Cheese dishes
Spreads (food)
Kentucky cuisine